Santanu Kumar Acharya (born 1933) is a National Sahitya Academy Award-winning Indian writer.

Life
Acharya, born in 1933 in Kolkata, comes from the village Siddheswar Pur of the Cuttack district Odisha. He served the Government of Odisha as a college teacher for 34 years, from 1958 to 1992. He retired as the Registrar of Utkal University.

Selected works
Acharya has written 16 novels, 23 short story collections comprising about 400 stories, and 11 children's books.

Novels

 Nara-Kinnara, 1962 (The Man and the Sub Humans)
 Shatabdira Nachiketa, 1965 (The Nachiketas of the Century)
 Tinoti Ratira Sakala, 1969 (The mornings of three dark nights)
 Dakshinabarta, 1973 (The turning point)
 Jatrara Prathama Pada, 1976 (The First Leg of the Journey)
 Anya Eka Sakaala Anya Eka Bharat, 1977 (It is another morning and it is another India)
 Shakuntala, 1980 (a novel on the Naxallite movements)
 Mantrinka Share, 1988 (The Minister's Share)
 Dharitrira Kanda, 1994 (The Weeping Earth)
 Anu Hajijibapare, 1996 (After Anu Got Lost)
 Adrushya Jagataru Barta, 1996 (Messages from the Unknown Worlds)
 Billy Goat Banam Uruvela Ghotak, 1997 (The man named Billy Goat alias The Laughung Horse of the Uruvela Forest where Goutama Buddha received Enlihtenment)
 Swarna Tribhuja, 1998 (Anthology of three novellas : Billy Goat.., Adrushya Jagataru Barta and Mantrinka Share) 
 Trishna: Eka Anaviskrita America, 1999 (The girl named Trishna: The Undiscovered America)
 Anomara Kanya, 2002 (The daughter Of Anoma or the River Maha Nadi)
 Jeje Malapare, ( After Jeje Died), Science Fiction,  Novel, Publ: Grantha Mandira, Binode Bihari, Cuttack-2, Odisha, November, 2020.

Short story collections

 Mana Murmur, 1962 (The Murmuring Mind)
 Durbaara, 1965 (The Incorrigible)
 Eii Shesha Padati, 1972 (This last utterance)
 Aranyara Chula, 1974 (The Tip of The Forest)
 Adina Boula, 1978 (Mango blossoms out of season)
 Ekabinsha Satabdi Paain Galpa, 1978 (Stories for the Twenty First Century)
 Karanjia Diary, 1984 (Based on the real life adventures and observations of the author in Karanjia, Mayurbhanj District
 Aadya Sakaala, 1985 (The first dawn)
 Sarpa Jaana, 1989 (The Snake Vehicle)
 Chalanti Thaakura, 1991 (God who Responds)
 Nataliyara Omkar, 1995 (The OM utterance of Nataliya)
 Galpa Varnali, 1997 (The Spectrum of Stories)
 Shreshtha Galpa, 1998 (A collection of the Best Short Stories)
 Jala Chhabira Raati, 1999 (A Night of Water Colors)
 Drushya-Adrushya, 2002 (The visible and the invisible)
 Chhaya Purusha, 2005 (The Person in the Shadow )
 Record Breaker, 2006 
 Trutiya Netra, 2007 (The Third Eye)
 Santanu Acharya's Galpa Samagra (Collection of short stories of the author)
 Vol 1, 2009
 Vol 2, 2011
 Kala Pardara Aarapate, 2013 (Behind the Black Veil)
 Santanu Acharya-nka Smaraniya Galpa, 2015 (Twenty Memorable Short Stories of the author)
  AshtaSiDdhi O Anyanya Galpa,2019, Published by PrachiSahitya Pratishan, Binode Bihari, Cuttack-2
 Anthology of Author's Recently written Stories of felt life experiences comprising dreams and  Occult Experiences.
 Katha Dashaka ( Ten Selected Stories of the Author Santanu Kumar Acharya ),First Ed 2021- Ed: Pitabas Routray, Publisher: Fhula Bhagaban Foundation,  Mahabir Prakashan, Old Bus Stand, Bhubaneswar, ISBN: 81-87989-32-17

Children's literature

 Mo Katha Ghoda Katha Kahe, 1961 (My Wooden Horse Speaks)
 Baga Bagichara Saudagara, 1962 (The Merchants of our  gardens)
 , 1963 (Seven Steps to the Heavens: A science fiction on Space Flight)
 Koshi Upatyakara Rajkumar Mohan, 1964 (Mohan, the  Prince of the Koshi Valley)
 Shaktira Karamati, 1971 (A book of Science on Machines and Power for Children)
 Mo Naan Da Vinci O Niaan Laga Opi, 1980 (My name is Da Vinchi and Opi the incendiary i,e Oppenheimer the creator  of the first atom bomb;  Biographies) 
 Nitidinia Jeebanare Bijnana, 1989 (Science in Everyday Life for Children )
 Baigyanika Abiskara o Udbhabana, 1989 (Important Scientific Discoveries and Life of  Scientists)
 Dine Akasha bi na thila, 2001 (Once upon a Time there were no Skies over our heads; Cosmology for Children)
 Peeta Prastara Udyana, 2010 (A travelogue on the Yellow Stone National Park, US)
   Kathare Kathare Bigyana,2020, All the books on Children's Literature authored by Santanu Kumar Acharya Collected into one Book, Published by Santosh Publications,Kanchan, Gajapati Nagar, Sutahata, Cuttack, 753003.

Others
Autobiography:
Mo Jeeban : Anya Eka Upanyasa, 2013 (My Life is Another Novel)

 Travelogue:
Baichitryamaya Desha: America Bhramana, 2015 (The Mysterious Country: America - A travelogue)

Books translated into other languages: 
English: 
 Shakuntala: award-winning original novel in Odia language, 1980, translated to English by Lipipushpa Nayak, first edition 2014  
 Anoma's Daughter: award-winning original novel in Odia, Anomara Kanya (2003), translated to English by Bibhas Mohanty and the author 
 Santanu Kumar Acharya: collection of short stories, published by Grass Roots, Kolkata, 2004, translated by St-Pierre, Leelawati Mohapatra and K.K. Mohapatra

Hindi:
  Nara Kinnara: first published in Odia language in Odisha, 1962, Odisha Sahitya Academy Award-winning classic Odia novel), translated from Odia to Hindi by Shanakar Lal Purohit, published by  Vijaya Books, Sahadara Delhi, 2017,    
Shakuntala (1987 Sarala Prize-winning Odia novel, first published in Odisha, 1980), published by Radhakrishna Prakashan (Rajkamal) Pvt Ltd (1997), Dariya Ganj, Delhi-2, translated from author's original novel Shakuntala in Odia to Hindi by Prof Radhakanta Mishra.
 Dakshinavarta, 2002 (novel), translated from author's novel Dakshinavarta in Odia to Hindi by Dr Srinivas Udgata 
Gujarati: 
 Dakshinavarta (novel), published by 1986, translated from author's original Odia novel Dakshinavarta to Gujarati and published by Dr Ranuka Sriram
Bengali:
Chalanti Thakura (Academy Award-winning book: short story collection of the author), published 1991, translated from author's original short story collection to Bengali by Shyamasundar Mahapatra and Amitrasudan Bhattacharya, published by Sahitya Akademi, New Delhi, 2016

Awards

 National Award for Children's Literature from the Ministry of Education, Government of India (1961 and 1963)
 1961: for Mo katha ghoda katha kahe (My Wooden Horse Speaks; Science Fiction for Children) 
 Odisha Sahitya Akademi Award, 1962 (for his novel Nara Kinnara)
 Sarala Puraskara, 1987 ; A prestigious literary award offered annually by Odisha's famous industrial house IMFA, for his novel Shakuntala
 Sahitya Akademi Award, 1993 (Indian National Academy of Literature) for his short story book Chalanti Thakura (The Living God)
 Bharatiya Bhasha Parishad, Kolkata, Konarka Prize, 1994, for his short story book: Chalanti Thakura (The Living God)
 Sahitya Bharati Puraskar, 2004, by Gangadhara Ratha Foundation, for his life-time achievements and contributions to Odia literature 
 Katha Puraskar, 2003, by Katha Bharati Foundation, New Delhi, for his Odia novel Anomara Kanya, translated into English as Anoma's Daughter
 Atibadi Jagannath Das Award, the highest honour given by the State, conferred by Sahitya Akademy, Odisha, for lifelong contribution to Odia literature and excellence, in a special ceremony, on 25 July 2014, at Bhubaneswar, Odisha

References

External links
 Novel Prose

1933 births
Living people
People from Cuttack district
Writers from Kolkata
Writers from Odisha
Odia-language writers
Odia novelists
Novelists from Odisha
Recipients of the Sahitya Akademi Award in Odia
Recipients of the Atibadi Jagannath Das Award
Recipients of the Odisha Sahitya Akademi Award
Academic staff of Utkal University
Articles containing video clips